Aníkúlápó is a 2022 Nigerian epic fantasy film produced by Kunle Afolayan and distributed by Netflix. Released on 30 September 2022, it stars Kunle Remi, Bimbo Ademoye, Sola Sobowale,Hakeem Kae-Kazim and Taiwo Hassan. The film was shot in Oyo State and Afolayan has described the work as a "Game of Thrones recreated in Nigeria but with a better representation of our culture (Yoruba culture)".

Synopsis 
Aníkúlápó narrates the story of Saro (played by Kunle Remi) who has recently arrived in Oyo as a stranger and a traditional textile weaver who uses the "aso-ofi" loom and technique. Saro has an illicit romance with Queen Arolake (played by Bimbo Ademoye) who has an unhappy marriage because she is hated by the King's wives and is also uninterested in the king, but it is her duty to lay with him. She is also young and uninterested in the older king's constant attention. His favoritism brings up rivalries with the other, older queens, who mistreat her. She and Saro fall in love. As they make plans to elope, word of their affair gets to the king, who sentences Saro to death. Based on the mythical Akala bird which wakes him from death, Saro, through the astute actions of Arolake, gains the power to resurrect the dead through a gourd stolen by Aroloke, and earns the name, Anikulapo (Aníkúlápó), which means the "one that holds death in his purse." As Saro becomes popular in their new village Ojumo, he sets amorous eyes on other women and betrays Arolake. His excessive pride is his hubris as he begins to make inordinate demands from the villagers before he can raise the dead. When Arolake hears that Saro has asked for the king's daughter before he can restore life to the king's heir, she undermines the source of his power and deserts him. Saro fails to resurrect the prince and discovers he no longer has the power to tame death.

Cast 
 Kunle Remi as Saro, the weaver
 Bimbo Ademoye as Queen Arolake, the youngest Oyo queen
 Hakeem Kae-Kazim as Oba Aderoju of Ojumo
 Sola Sobowale as Awarun, the businesswoman who runs a ceramics workshop / factory
 Taiwo Hassan as Alaafin Ademuyiwa
 Ropo Ewenla as Asohun Oba for Ojumo town
 Faithia Balogun as Ojumo Queen
 Kareem Adepoju as Ojuma Chief
 Eyiyemi Afolayan as Omowunmi, Daughter of one of the Alaafin Queens (this actress, the director's daughter, makes her feature film debut here).
 Adebowale Adedayo (Mr Macaroni) as Akanji, an Oyo citizen who gives Saro advice
 Oga Bello as Oyo Chief
 Moji Olayiwola
 Aisha Lawal as Olori Sukanmi
 Dele Odule
 Yinka Quadri as Ojumo Hunter

Production 
The production also featured the filmmaker, Kunle Afolayan's daughter, Eyiyemi Afolayan, this has been described by BusinessDay as Afolayan "cementing family's legacy" since their dynasty has been known to be in the film industry from their first generation.

References

External links 
 
 

2022 films
Nigerian epic films
Yoruba-language films
Films directed by Kunle Afolayan
Films shot in Oyo
Netflix original films
Nigerian fantasy films
Epic fantasy films
2022 fantasy films